Hương Sơn may refer to:

Hương Sơn District, Hà Tĩnh Province, Vietnam
Hương Sơn, Bắc Giang, Vietnam